Paleh Bid-e Sofla (also Romanized as Paleh Bīd-e Soflá; also known as Palebīd, Pal-e Bīd, and Paleh Bīd) is a village in Beshiva Pataq Rural District, in the Central District of Sarpol-e Zahab County, Kermanshah Province, Iran. At the 2006 census, its population was 61, in 17 families.

References 

Populated places in Sarpol-e Zahab County